Dev Raj Joshi is a Nepalese politician, belonging to the Nepali Congress. He was Appointed Governor, as per the Article 163 (2) of the Constitution of Nepal by the President Bidya Devi Bhandari on the recommendation of the Council of Ministers of the Government of Nepal on 9 November 2021. In the 2008 Constituent Assembly election he was elected from the Bajura-1 constituency, winning 19271 votes.

References

External links

Living people
Year of birth missing (living people)
Nepali Congress politicians from Sudurpashchim Province
People from Bajura District

Members of the 1st Nepalese Constituent Assembly
Nepal MPs 1991–1994